Dynatocephala altivola is a moth of the family Tortricidae. It is found in Vietnam.

The wingspan is 32 mm. The ground colour of the forewings is brownish yellow, but pale brownish in the distal half of the wing. The suffusions and rows of dots in the posterior third of the wing are brown. The markings are also brown, but partially diffuse. The hindwings are greyish brown.

References

Moths described in 2009
Archipini
Moths of Asia
Taxa named by Józef Razowski